The 1989 Continental Airlines London Masters was a professional invitational snooker tournament, which took place from 22 September 1988 to 23 May 1989 at the Café Royal in London, England.

Stephen Hendry won the tournament beating John Parrott 4–2 in the final.

Main draw

References

London Masters (snooker)
London Masters
London Masters
London Masters
London Masters